The Committee for the Defense of Human Rights in the Arabian Peninsula (CDHRAP) is a Saudi Arabian human rights non-governmental organisation based in Beirut.

Structure and leadership
, CDHRAP was chaired by Mohammad Abul Azeem al-Hussain.

Aims and actions
The CDHRAP is a Saudi Arabian human rights non-governmental organisation created in 1992 and based in Beirut that states its belief in human rights "guaranteed by international treaties and conventions so long as they do not contradict with Islamic Laws". It declares itself opposed to human rights violations in the Arabian Peninsula, especially against the Shi'a minority. It claims to oppose religion-based discrimination in general. CDHRAP acts by publishing news releases, monthly and annual documents in English, Arabic and Persian and cooperating with international human rights organisations.

Saudi government reactions
In 2001, about ten United States and other software companies competed to provide software for internet censorship in Saudi Arabia. The New York Times identified CDHRAP's website as one of the websites to be blocked.

See also
Human rights in Saudi Arabia

References

External links
CDHRAP web site (English)
Arabic version - more extensive
Persian version

1992 establishments in Lebanon
Organizations established in 1992
Human rights organisations based in Lebanon
Human rights in Saudi Arabia
International organisations based in Lebanon
Saudi Arabian democracy movements
2011–2012 Saudi Arabian protests
Organizations of the Arab Spring
Saudi Arabian human rights organisations